HMS Colchester was a 50-gun fourth rate ship of the line of the Royal Navy, built at Southampton according to the dimensions laid down in the 1741 proposals of the 1719 Establishment, and launched on 20 September 1745. She was ordered as a replacement for the previous , which had been wrecked just two months after being launched.

Colchester served until 1762, when she was found to be unfit for service. She was eventually broken up in 1773.

Notes

References

Lavery, Brian (2003) The Ship of the Line - Volume 1: The development of the battlefleet 1650-1850. Conway Maritime Press. .
Michael Phillips. Colchester (50) (1744). Michael Phillips' Ships of the Old Navy. Retrieved 10 August 2008.
Michael Phillips. Colchester (50) (1746). Michael Phillips' Ships of the Old Navy. Retrieved 10 August 2008.

Ships of the line of the Royal Navy
1746 ships